The 2017 Atlantic Championship Series season was the fourth season of the revived Atlantic Championship. The series is organized by Formula Race Promotions. Sanctioning for the 2017 season has passed from SCCA Pro Racing to the United States Auto Club. American Peter Portante won the championship by a comfortable 96 point margin over Atlantics veteran David Grant. Portante won nine of the fourteen races, David Grant won three and his brother Keith Grant won an additional two. The series raced on the Indianapolis Motor Speedway road course for the only time in its history.

Race calendar and results

References

Atlantic Championship
Atlantic Championship seasons